Frankfurt-Niederrad station is a station in the district of Niederrad in the southwest of Frankfurt am Main in the German state of Hesse.

Location

In 1977, during the building of the Rhine-Main S-Bahn, the former station building of Niederrad station was closed. The entrances to the S-Bahn station are located about 700 metres further south on Lyoner Straße. The station is rated by Deutsche Bahn as a category 3 station. It consists of four platform tracks on the Main Railway. It is located on an elevated position above Adolf-Miersch-Straße and Lyoner Straße. The two platforms are accessible from the street via lifts and stairs. All trains running through Frankfurt-Niederrad pass over the Main on either of the two Niederrad  bridges located north of the station.

Connections
The station is used by Regional-Express and Regionalbahn services and by lines S7, S8 and S9 of the Rhine-Main S-Bahn. Intercity and Intercity-Express services pass by on the Mannheim–Frankfurt railway without stopping. A few years ago some InterCity trains also stopped in the off-peak.

Underneath the station there are interchanges with tram lines 12 and 19 (runs only at certain times) and bus lines 78, 79 (runs only in the mornings and from Monday to Friday) and 84.

Services 

  Frankfurt Hbf – Frankfurt Airport – Rüsselsheim – Mainz Hbf – Bingen – Koblenz Hbf 
  Frankfurt Hbf – Frankfurt Airport – Rüsselsheim – Mainz Hbf – Bad Kreuznach – Saarbrücken Hbf
  Frankfurt Hbf – Riedstadt-Goddelau – Gernsheim – Biblis – Mannheim Hbf
  Riedstadt-Goddelau – Frankfurt Hbf
  Wiesbaden Hbf – Frankfurt Hbf (tief) – Hanau Hbf
  Wiesbaden Hbf – Frankfurt Hbf (tief) – Hanau Hbf

Notes

Rhine-Main S-Bahn stations
Railway stations in Frankfurt
Railway stations in Germany opened in 1977